The Vingeanne is a river in France, a right tributary of the Saône, which in turn is a tributary of the Rhône.
It was the scene of an important battle during the Gallic Wars.
The river supplies water to the Canal entre Champagne et Bourgogne, a navigable waterway that connects the Marne and the Saône, and thus links Paris to the Mediterranean.

Description

Course

The Vinganne is a torrential watercourse.
The source of the Vingeanne is near the village of Aprey, Haute-Marne.
It forms as a stream that has carved a narrow canyon in the edge of the Langres plateau.
Tributaries are the streams (ruisseaux) of Flagey, Leuchey, Anjeurres and Orain.

Flow

Canal

The Canal entre Champagne et Bourgogne, crosses the Langres plateau watershed between the Marne to the northwest and the Saône to the southeast.
Much of the route on the Saône side is along the Vingeanne valley.

The Langres plateau has  of annual rainfall, and can supply sufficient water, but seasonal variations in the flow of the Marne and the Vingeanne make the water supply in summer unreliable.
Reservoirs are needed to ensure a reliable supply year round.
This was recognized by Roger de Fontenay in his 1781 plan for the canal, and again by Brière de Montidour, chief engineer of the Corps des Ponts et Chaussées, in 1835.
The canal designers planned four reservoirs, three on the Marne side and the  Lac de Villegusien on the Vingeanne.

Lac de Villegusien
 
The  cement-covered dyke of compacted clay-sand soil was built on the Vingeanne between 1902 and 1904, and was the longest in Europe at the time.
The reservoir was put into operation in the winter of 1905-06, and the canal was opened for navigation in early 1907.

There are two intake turrets, which may send some of the water to the Moulin de Villegusien.
A large cast iron pipe has the potential to supply water for power generation, but was not used as of 2017.
The lake is used for swimming, sailing, fishing and bird watching.

The village of Villegusien-le-Lac is just southeast of the lake, between it and the canal.

Fish
The Vingeanne is an exceptional 2nd category river because it shelters many species of fish.
Trout and "Satoille" (probably the European river lamprey) were fished in the Bèze, the Saône and Vingeanne in the Middle Ages. 
Margaret III, Countess of Flanders recounts having tasted the fish in 1382–83. 
Some of the upstream courses have trout, and the Dame Fario  (Salmo trutta fario: brown trout) is common upstream with a spawning area in Saint Maurice sur Vingeanne.
There are many species of cyprinids and pike is present throughout.
The Amicale des pêcheurs de haute et moyenne Vingeanne, a fishers' association, practices a heritage management policy, and releases rainbow trout for the opening of the season in March and for holidaymakers in June.

Historical facts

Lait Pur Sterilisé de la Vingeanne

The Quillot Brothers had a dairy in the village of Montigny sur Vingeanne where they produced sterilized milk.
In 1897, they commissioned the Swiss artist Théophile Steinlen (1859–1923) to produce a poster advertising their product.
The result was an endearing poster that shows the artist's daughter Colette tasting a bowl of milk before giving it to the family cats, who are waiting expectantly.

Steinlen was a prolific artist, but this early work is his most successful poster.

Battle of Vingeanne

In July 52 BC the Roman general Julius Caesar fought an important battle of the Gallic Wars against a coalition of Gauls led by Vercingetorix.
Caesar responded to an attack against Gallia Narbonensis by leading his forces east through Lingones territory towards Sequani territory, probably marching down the Vingeanne valley.
He had recently recruited (or hired) German cavalry, and they would prove decisive.

The Gallic army held a very strong position guarded by high slopes, easy to defend.
It was protected by the Vingeanne on the right, and the Badin, a small tributary of the Vingeanne, on its front.
Near the road, and to the west, rise hills which dominated the ground, as well as the whole country, up to the Badin and the Vingeanne.

The Gauls thought the Romans were retreating towards Italy and decided to attack.
One group of Gallic cavalry blocked the Roman advance while two groups of cavalry harried the Roman's flanks.
After hard fighting, the German cavalry broke the Gallic cavalry on the right and chased them back to the main Gallic infantry force.
The remaining Gallic cavalry fled, and Vercingetorix was forced to retreat to Alesia, where he was besieged by the Romans.
The Battle of Alesia decided the war in the Romans' favor.

Communes
The Vingeanne crosses 3 departments and 30 communes:

In Haute-Marne it crosses Aprey, Baissey, Choilley-Dardenay, Cusey, Dommarien, Longeau-Percey, Villegusien-le-Lac and Villiers-lès-Aprey.
In Côte-d'Or it crosses Beaumont-sur-Vingeanne, Blagny-sur-Vingeanne, Champagne-sur-Vingeanne, Chaume-et-Courchamp, Cheuge, Dampierre-et-Flée, Fontaine-Française, Heuilley-sur-Saône, Jancigny, Licey-sur-Vingeanne, Montigny-Mornay-Villeneuve-sur-Vingeanne, Oisilly, Pouilly-sur-Vingeanne, Renève, Saint-Maurice-sur-Vingeanne, Saint-Seine-sur-Vingeanne and Talmay.
In Haute-Saône it crosses Attricourt, Germigney, Lœuilley, Percey-le-Grand and Saint-Sauveur.

Notes

Sources

Further reading

External links
 

Rivers of Grand Est
Rivers of Bourgogne-Franche-Comté
Rivers of Côte-d'Or
Rivers of Haute-Marne
Rivers of Haute-Saône
Rivers of France